Sylvia Schenk (born 1 June 1952) is a German middle-distance runner. She competed in the women's 800 metres at the 1972 Summer Olympics for West Germany.

References

1952 births
Living people
Athletes (track and field) at the 1972 Summer Olympics
German female middle-distance runners
Olympic athletes of West Germany
Place of birth missing (living people)
20th-century German women